The 2017–18 Southern Illinois women's basketball team represents Southern Illinois University Carbondale during the 2017–18 NCAA Division I women's basketball season. The Salukis were led by fifth year head coach Cindy Stein. They play their home games at SIU Arena and were members of the Missouri Valley Conference. They finished the season 17–14, 11–7 in MVC play to finish in fourth place. They advanced to the semifinals of the Missouri Valley women's tournament where they lost to Drake.

Previous season
They finished the season 16–15, 10–8 in MVC play to finish in fourth place. They lost in the quarterfinals of the Missouri Valley women's tournament to Wichita State. They were invited to the Women's Basketball Invitational where they lost to Milwaukee in the first round.

Roster

Schedule

|-
!colspan=9 style=| Exhibition

|-
!colspan=9 style=| Non-conference regular season

|-
!colspan=9 style=| Missouri Valley regular season

|-
!colspan=9 style=| Missouri Valley Women's Tournament

See also
2017–18 Southern Illinois Salukis men's basketball team

References

Southern Illinois Salukis women's basketball seasons
Southern Illinois